Tal Bachman is the debut album from Canadian singer-songwriter Tal Bachman. It contains the 1999 hit single "She's So High", which peaked at #1 on the Adult Top 40 Chart and No. 14 on the Billboard Hot 100.

Critical reception

Stephen Thomas Erlewine of AllMusic writes, "Living up to the legend of Randy Bachman might not be as overwhelming as living up to the legacy of John Lennon, but Tal Bachman does something neither Julian nor Sean Lennon did -- he made a debut album that has nothing to do whatsoever with his father's music."

Track listing

Personnel

 Tal Bachman – rhythm guitar, lap steel guitar, piano, lead and background vocals
 Lance Porter – drums
 Chris Wyse – bass
 Buck Johnson – Wurlitzer, B3, Moog, background vocals

Production
 Bob Rock – mixing, producer
 Tal Bachman – mixing, producer, orchestral arrangements
 Brian Joseph Dobbs – engineer
 Mike Gillies – additional engineering
 George Marino – mastering
 Paul Buckmaster – conductor, orchestral arrangements

Track information and credits adapted from the album's liner notes.

Charts

Singles

References 

1999 debut albums
Albums produced by Bob Rock
Columbia Records albums